Rose hip seed oil is a pressed seed oil, extracted from the seeds of the wild rose bush Rosa rubiginosa in the southern Andes. Rosehip seed oil can also be extracted from Rosa canina, a wild rose species native to Europe, northwest Africa, and western Asia. The fruits of the rosehip have been used in folk medicine for a long time. Rosehips have prophylactic and therapeutic actions against the common cold, infectious diseases, gastrointestinal disorders, urinary tract diseases, and inflammatory diseases.

Nutrition 
The oil contains provitamin A (mostly beta-Carotene). It has been wrongly said to contain retinol (vitamin A) which is a vitamin solely made by animals from provitamin A. It does however contain levels (up to .357 mg/L) of tretinoin or all-trans retinoic acid, a vitamin A acid that retinol converts to.

Similarly, while the fruit is rich in vitamin C, the oil does not contain any, as it is a water-soluble vitamin.

Rose hip seed oil is high in the essential fatty acids: linoleic acid or omega-6, and  α-linolenic acid or omega-3.

Rose hips are remarkable fruits for their traditional pharmaceutical uses, which may be partly attributed to their rich profile of bioactives, especially antioxidant phenolics (Olsson et al., 2005). The seed lipids of rose hips contain high amounts
of polyunsaturated fatty acids (Szentmihalyi et al., 2002). Rose hips are popular due to their food, phytomedicine, and
cosmo-nutraceutical uses (Uggla et al., 2003). The fruits (rose hips) of Rosa canina in particular contain high content of
vitamin C and proanthocyanidins and are used for various food and pharmaceutical applications (Osmianski et al., 1986).
This chapter mainly focuses on the traditional pharmaceutical and food science applications of rose hips and the essential
oil of a widely distributed species of rose hips, R. canina L 
https://www.researchgate.net/publication/283507224_Rose_Hip_Rosa_canina_L_oils/link/5a6dfc610f7e9bd4ca6d46bd/download

Uses 
Researchers have tested the efficacy of topical rose hip seed oil together with an oral fat-soluble vitamins on different inflammatory dermatitis such as eczema, neurodermatitis, and cheilitis, with promising findings of the topical use of rose hip seed oil on these inflammatory dermatose. Due its high composition of UFAs and antioxidants, rose hip oil has relatively high protection against inflammation and oxidative stress.

Research on rose hip oil has shown that it reduces skin pigmentation, reduces discolouration, acne lesions, scars and stretch marks, as well as retaining the moisture of the skin and delaying the appearance of wrinkles. Cosmetologists recommend wild rose seed oil as a natural skin-vitaliser.

A 2014 study on the nutritional composition and phytochemical composition of the rose hip seed and the fatty acid and sterol compositions of the seed oil showed that rose hip seed and seed oil were good sources of phytonutrients. Consumption of foods rich in phytonutrients is recommended to reduce the risk of chronic diseases. The nutritional composition and the presence of bioactive compounds make the rose hip seed a valuable source of phytonutrients. The rose hip seed was highly rich in carbohydrates and ascorbic acid, and the rose hip seed oil was highly rich in polyunsaturated fatty acids and phytosterols. The rose hip seed and seed oil proved to have antioxidant activity. The findings of the study indicated that the rose hip seed and seed oil may be proposed as ingredients in functional food formulations and dietary supplements.

References

Further reading 

 Andersson, Staffan (2009). Carotenoids, tocochromanols and chlorophylls in sea buckthorn berries (Hippophae rhamnoides) and Rose Hips (Rosa sp.). Diss. (sammanfattning/summary) Alnarp : Sveriges lantbruksuniv., Acta Universitatis agriculturae Sueciae, 1652-6880 ; 2009:58.  
 Musa Özcan. Journal of Medicinal Food. September 2002, 5(3): 137–140. doi:10.1089/10966200260398161.

Vegetable oils
Roses